Ben Castle (born 13 January 1980, Wellington, New Zealand) is a former professional Rugby Union player. A prop forward, Castle played in New Zealand for Bay of Plenty, Waikato Chiefs, in Australia for the Western Force and in France for Toulon. In June 2009 he joined Welsh regional team Newport Gwent Dragons.
 
Castle has also represented New Zealand 'A'.

In January 2012 Castle announced his retirement from rugby due to a persistent back injury.

Castle was the Manager of Player Contracting and Relationships at New Zealand Rugby, now General Manager for Rugby at the Hurricanes Super Rugby Team and commentates for Sky Television.

References

New Zealand rugby union players
Dragons RFC players
Chiefs (rugby union) players
Western Force players
Bay of Plenty rugby union players
RC Toulonnais players
1980 births
Living people
Rugby union players from Wellington City
New Zealand expatriate rugby union players
New Zealand expatriate sportspeople in Wales
New Zealand expatriate sportspeople in Australia
New Zealand expatriate sportspeople in France
Expatriate rugby union players in Wales
Expatriate rugby union players in Australia
Expatriate rugby union players in France
Rugby union props